The 2021–22 season is Bradford City's 119th year in existence and third consecutive season in League Two. Along with the league, the club will also compete in the FA Cup, the EFL Cup and the EFL Trophy. The season covers the period from 1 July 2021 to 30 June 2022.

During pre-season, Derek Adams was appointed as Bantams new manager.

Pre-season friendlies
Bradford City revealed they would have pre-season friendlies against Bradford (Park Avenue), Eccleshill United, Doncaster Rovers, Guiseley, Brighouse Town, Blackburn Rovers, Chesterfield and Accrington Stanley as part of their preparations for the new season.

Competitions

League Two

League table

Results summary

Results by matchday

Matches
The Bantams' fixtures were released on 24 June 2021.

FA Cup

Bradford City were drawn at home to Exeter City in the first round.

EFL Cup

Bradford City were drawn away to Nottingham Forest in the first round.

EFL Trophy

Group game fixture dates were announced on 22 July.

Squad Statistics

As of 7 May 2022.

Transfers

Transfers in

Loans in

Loans out

Transfers out

References

Bradford City
Bradford City A.F.C. seasons